Dongxing is a county-level city within Fangchenggang, Guangxi, People's Republic of China, on the border with Móng Cái, in Vietnam. The city spans an area of 549 square kilometers, and has a population of approximately 130,000 as of 2011.

History
During the Mạc dynasty (1533-1592), the land south of the Shiwandashan Mountains was ceded to the Ming dynasty. Jiangping was a melting pot of Vietnamese and Chinese, however, the region was neglected by the Vietnamese government. During the 18th and 19th, the area became a hotbed of piracy (see: Pirates of the South China Coast). After the end of the Sino-French War in 1885, Jiangping, Bailong Peninsula, and the Jing Islands were ceded by the French to Qing China. The Jing Islands are home to the Gin people, a group of ethnic Vietnamese in China.

During the Qing Dynasty, the area was administered as Fangcheng County. Dongxing was briefly established as a city in 1950 but was merged back into Fangcheng County by 1952. On December 25, 1978, Fangcheng County was re-designated as Fangcheng Various Nationalities Autonomous County.

On May 23, 1993, Fangcheng Various Nationalities Autonomous County was abolished, as the prefecture-level city of Fangchenggang was created. With this, the county-level division of Dongxing Economic Development Zone was established.

On April 29, 1996, the Dongxing Economic Development Zone was abolished, and the county-level city of Dongxing was established.

Refugees from Vietnam
In the summer of 1978, the Friendship Bridge that connected Dongxing and Mong Cai in Vietnam became a makeshift refugee camp for thousands of ethnic Chinese fleeing Vietnam. Ethnic Chinese had lived in Northern Vietnam for decades under Communist rule, but after the North and South unified in April 1975, the Communist government saw the Chinese in the South, many of whom were receiving political and financial aid by Beijing following the Vietnam War, and were a threat to the aspirations of the Việt Cộng who began persecuting the Chinese, forcing many to flee by boat. They became part of the known Boat People. This caused an exodus of over 250,000 Chinese from Vietnam to China, mainly to Dongxing.

Geography
Dongxing is located in the very south of Guangxi, on the northwest shores of the Gulf of Tonkin. The Beilun River marks the southwest border of Dongxing, with Vietnam on the other side of the river. The terrain is largely hilly.

Climate 
Dongxing has a monsoon-influenced humid subtropical climate (Köppen Cwa), with mild to warm winters and long, hot (but not especially) summers, and very humid conditions year-round. Rain is both the heaviest and most frequent from June to September when 70% of the annual rainfall also occurs. This is in contrast to the autumn and winter months, where only  of rain falls per month.

Administrative divisions

Economy 
The city is home to various natural resources, including titanium, manganese, quartz, granite, and various crystals.

Major tourist attractions in the city include its beaches, mangrove forests, the Beilun River, and ethnic Vietnamese settlements on the islands of Wutou (Vietnamese: đảo Vu Đầu, chữ Nôm: 島巫頭), Wanwei (Vietnamese: đảo Vạn Vĩ, chữ Nôm: 島万尾), and Shanxin (Vietnamese: đảo Sơn Tâm, chữ Nôm: 島山心).

See also 

 Gin people

References

External links

County-level divisions of Guangxi
Cities in Guangxi
China–Vietnam border crossings
Fangchenggang